The Presbyterian Blue Hose men's basketball team is the basketball team that represents Presbyterian College in Clinton, South Carolina, United States. The school's team currently competes in the Big South Conference.

Postseason

CIT Results
The Blue Hose have appeared in the Division I CollegeInsider.com Postseason Tournament (CIT) one time. Their record is 2–1.

NCAA Division II tournament results
The Blue Hose have appeared in the NCAA Division II tournament four times. Their combined record is 3–4.

NAIA tournament results
The Blue Hose have appeared in the NAIA tournament one time. Their record is 0–1.

References

External links
Website